Herrán is a Colombian municipality and town located in the department of North Santander.

References
  Government of Norte de Santander - Herrán

Municipalities of the Norte de Santander Department